Vladimir Sokolov (born 29 August 1962) is a former Olympic rower. He competed for the Unified Team at the 1992 Summer Olympics and for Russia at the 1996 Summer Olympics, where he won a bronze medal in the coxed eight event.

References 
 

1962 births
Living people
Soviet male rowers
Russian male rowers
Rowers at the 1992 Summer Olympics
Rowers at the 1996 Summer Olympics
Olympic rowers of the Unified Team
Olympic rowers of Russia
Olympic bronze medalists for Russia
Olympic medalists in rowing
Medalists at the 1996 Summer Olympics